Andrew Alturo Fahie (born 7 August 1970) is a British Virgin Islands politician who served as Premier of the British Virgin Islands from 2019 to 2022. He was also the chairman of the Virgin Islands Party in the British Virgin Islands from 2016 to 2022.

Fahie was the elected House of Assembly member for the First District from 1999 to 2022. He was appointed chairman of the Virgin Islands Party on 30 November 2016 after winning a leadership contest with incumbent leader, Julian Fraser.  On 6 February 2017 he was officially appointed Leader of the Opposition.  On 25 February 2019 Fahie led his party to victory in the 2019 British Virgin Islands general election, and was sworn in as Premier the following day.

On 28 April 2022, Fahie was arrested in the United States on charges related to drug trafficking and money laundering. Shortly afterwards, on 5 May 2022, he was removed as Premier by a near-unanimous vote in the House of Assembly. He remained as the First District Representative until November 2022.

He is often referred to by his nickname, the Brown Bomber.

Early life and education
Andrew Fahie was born in 1970 to Ernest Alturo Fahie and Iris Dorene Romney.

After graduating from the BVI High School in 1986, Fahie attended the University of the Virgin Islands in St. Thomas, U.S. Virgin Islands, and then earned a BSc in Education from Florida A&M University, graduating in 1991.

After that he initially taught as a Maths teacher at Elmore Stoutt High School.

Fahie is married to Sheila Fahie (née Herbert-Forbes).  Together they have had three children, one of whom died in infancy.

Political career
Fahie was first elected as the 1st District representative in 1999 at the age of 28, and he has held that seat continuously since then.  He has previously served as Minister for Education and Culture from 2007 to 2011, and as Minister for Health, Education and Welfare from 2000 to 2003.  Since 1999 he has dominated the voting in his 1st District - his smallest margin of victory has been 27.6% of the vote (2015).

Leader of the Opposition

In the 2015 general election only two members of the Virgin Islands Party won their seats - Julian Fraser and Fahie.  Subsequently, Fraser and Fahie argued over who should be named as leader of the opposition, as Fraser believed that he should take over as the incumbent party leader following the general election defeat.  Fahie disagreed as he believed the majority of party members would prefer him to take over as leader following the party's disastrous electoral defeat.

As the Constitution required that the Leader of the Opposition commanded a support of the "majority" of the opposition members, and the only two opposition members disagreed, there was an impasse.  Governor John Duncan gave the men a month to resolve their differences, but they were unable to do so, and eventually the Governor appointed Fraser as the official Leader of the Opposition.

Fahie later ousted Fraser as party leader, and was appointed Leader of the Opposition in his stead.

He was succeeded by Ronnie Skelton as opposition leader on 22 December 2018 after the ruling Government party split, and the Skelton-led faction became the largest opposition party.

Fahie, when he was Leader of the Opposition, frequently commented that a Commission of Inquiry was needed into BVI Government corruption.
Two years after he was elected as Premier of the Virgin Islands, then-Governor Augustus Jaspert announced that there would be a Commission of Inquiry and the Report of that Inquiry was published in late April 2022, one day after Fahie's arrest in connection to drug trafficking, money laundering and terrorism financing.

Premier
Fahie led his party to victory in the 2019 British Virgin Islands general election, and was sworn in as Premier the following day.

He was removed as Premier on 5 May 2022 after the House of Assembly passed a no-confidence motion against his government.

Resignation

He formally resigned his seat at representative of the First District on 24 November 2022.  In his resignation letter to the Speaker of the House he indicated that he was retiring from representational politics.

Shooting incident

In 2007 Fahie suffered a gunshot wound to his left leg during an attempted bank robbery.  The wound was not serious.  Fahie tried to sue the bank for the injuries he received.  He lost at trial, and the case was settled before the appeal was heard.

Money laundering and cocaine allegations

2003
In 2003, Offshore Alert reported that Fahie was under investigation about allegations of money laundering.  Fahie did not deny that an investigation took place, but contended that no action was taken against him as a result of the investigation.  He called the allegations "outdated, unproven, and unsubstantiated".

2022
On 28 April 2022, Fahie was arrested by the US Drug Enforcement Administration (DEA) in Miami on charges related to money laundering, conspiracy to import 5 kg (11 lb) of cocaine, and planning to assist the Mexico-based Sinaloa Cartel in moving thousands of kilograms of cocaine into the United States for a percentage of the proceeds. He reportedly intends to plead not guilty.

Electoral history

References

1970 births
British Virgin Islands politicians
Florida A&M University alumni
Living people
Members of the House of Assembly of the British Virgin Islands
People from Tortola
Premiers of the British Virgin Islands
University of the Virgin Islands alumni
Virgin Islands Party politicians